Under the Dark Cloth is the sixth studio album by Northern Irish recording artist Duke Special. It was self-released on 29 November 2011. It is the result of an invitation by the Department of Photography of the Metropolitan Museum of Art in New York to write a suite of songs inspired by the work of pioneering photographers Paul Strand, Alfred Stieglitz and Edward Steichen. The songs were co-written by Duke Special and Boo Hewerdine, with the exception of "You Press the Button and We’ll Do the Rest" which was co-written by Duke Special and Neil Hannon, and are accompanied in the recording by the RTÉ Concert Orchestra performing arrangements by Irish composer and arranger Michael Keeney.

Track listing

References

Duke Special albums